János Matolcsi (20 November 1923 – 3 January 1983) was a Hungarian Communist politician, who served as Minister of Agriculture from 1955 until the Hungarian Revolution of 1956. After the uprising he was the general director of the Hungarian Agricultural Museum (1957–1968).

References
 Magyar Életrajzi Lexikon	

1923 births
1983 deaths
People from Berettyóújfalu
Hungarian Communist Party politicians
Members of the Hungarian Working People's Party
Agriculture ministers of Hungary
Members of the National Assembly of Hungary (1953–1958)